Jenny Pat (August 8, 1981 – December 29, 2014) was a Hong Kong-born, Chinese-Canadian international art dealer, visual artist, and television personality known for her work on the Discovery Channel series, Dealers.

Personal life and career
Jenny Pat was born in Hong Kong on 8 August 1981, and moved to Vancouver in 1995. She was the daughter of William Pat, and Fu Yixuan, second daughter of the renowned modern Chinese painter Fu Baoshi. Like her grandfather and the rest of her family, she was a visual artist and an art specialist.

Studied in Maryknoll Convent School (Hong Kong), and Prince of Wales Secondary School (Vancouver), she graduated from the University of British Columbia (Vancouver) in Asian Art History. Her first television appearance was at the age of 4, on a Hong Kong local kids program with TVB. While in Vancouver, Pat starred in numerous television and stage productions. She auditioned to become a television presenter for Fairchild TV in 1998 and became an on-air weather reporter shortly after. Two years later, Fairchild Television producers invited her to host their longest running program, "What's On (熒幕八爪娛)". In 2012, Pat was invited by Discovery Channel to partake in their new television series titled Dealers as one of the five top dealers that assess and bid for art works and collectables brought in by the public.

She worked for Christie's Auction house's Chinese Paintings Department as a specialist, helping the auction house in a few memorable sales of her grandfather's works. As of January 2011, Christie's still holds Fu Baoshi's world record at US$9 million (70.1 million HKD).

Death
It was reported that Pat was found unconscious in her Tai Po home on December 29, 2014.  She was pronounced dead upon arrival at the hospital.  The cause of death was an accidental overdose of flu and other prescription psychotropic medications.  Pat had been preparing for an upcoming art exhibition in Beijing.  She was 33 years old.

References

External links
 
 Jennypat's Doodles on Facebook (official Facebook artist's page)
 Jenny Pat's Official Doodles Website [Official Doodles Website to purchase her art]
 Discovery Channel UK "Dealers" Official page
 New Straits Times: Unlocking the Value Art

1981 births
2014 deaths
Artists from Vancouver
Canadian cartoonists
Canadian women cartoonists
Canadian women illustrators
Canadian women television hosts
Canadian television hosts
Hong Kong cartoonists
Hong Kong comics artists
Hong Kong emigrants to Canada
University of British Columbia alumni
Accidental deaths in Hong Kong
Drug-related deaths in Hong Kong
Hong Kong women artists
Canadian female comics artists
Chinese female comics artists
Chinese cartoonists
Chinese women cartoonists
Chinese women illustrators
Chinese women television presenters